Henry Purdy (born 21 May 1994) is an English rugby union footballer who currently plays for Bristol Bears. He plays as a centre or wing.

Purdy signed for Gloucester Rugby for the 2014–2015 season after previously spending three years at the Leicester Tigers academy. An injury to Henry Trinder at the beginning of the season allowed Purdy extra game-time in Trinders position at outside centre. He made his Gloucester debut against the Exeter Chiefs.

On 2 August 2019, Purdy travelled to the southern hemisphere in New Zealand to join province Otago in the 2019 Mitre 10 Cup. He subsequently joined Coventry in the RFU Championship in November 2019. He joined Bristol Bears on 14 January 2020 on loan for the remainder of the 2019/20 season, and he scored a try against Gloucester on his first Premiership start for the club. After scoring a try in his next start, a 20–14 win against Northampton Saints, he signed a permanent two-year deal with Bristol.

References

External links
Gloucester Rugby Profile
RFU profile

1994 births
Living people
Bristol Bears players
Coventry R.F.C. players
English rugby union players
Gloucester Rugby players
Leicester Tigers players
Nottingham R.F.C. players
Otago rugby union players
People educated at Cokethorpe School
Rugby union players from Oxford
Rugby union centres